Bassa is a Local Government Area in Kogi State, Nigeria. Its northern border is the Benue River and its western border is the Niger River. Its headquarters are in the town of Oguma.

It has an area of 1,925 km and a population of 139,993 at the 2006 census. As of 2016, the population grew to 188,600.and as at 2022 projected to be 279,300.

Bassa-nge towns consist mainly of Gboloko, Ajigido, Kpata and Ecewu.

The postal code of the area is 272.

Bassa Local Government Kogi State, Bassa has three major tribes. The Bassa-komo, Bassa-nge and Egbira koto . The Bassa-Komo has the highest population followed by Bassa-nge and Egbira koto. The traditional title holder of The Bassa-Komos is the "AGUMA" of Bassa who is a 1st class chief, The "Etsu" of Bassa-Nge also a 1st class chief and the "OHIOGBA" of Mozum is the traditional chief of the Egbiras koto as the 3rd class chief.

The traditional title holder of the Bassa Nge is the Etsu Bassa Nge. The Etsu of Bassa Nge has his royal throne dominant in Gboloko. Gboloko is the kingdom headquarter of the Bassa Nge Kingdom.

History of the Bassa-Nge

The Bassa-Nge tribe can be traced historically to the Nupe Tribe. History has it that the Bassa-Nge people were formerly one with the Nupe. They spoke the same language, having the same culture. During the Great Fulani Jihad, while most of them accepted the Islamic faith, the rest of them, fled to the Middle Belt, towards South-West Nigeria to the present Kwara State Ilorin where they resided. Following the war conquest of the region, most of them accepted Islam while the remaining people fled across the Confluence river of Lokoja. Reaching the land across the great river, the elders said" babo sa umo ge" which when transliterated to Nupe language means " here is good and it is fine". It was later shortened to 'bassa-nge' which stand as the name of their variety of the Nupe language presently.

References

VICTOR AGBANYA

Local Government Areas in Kogi State